Denis Makarov (born August 3, 1983) is a Russian ice hockey player who is currently playing for HC Spartak Moscow team in Russia.

References

 

1983 births
HC Khimik Voskresensk players
HC Lada Togliatti players
Severstal Cherepovets players
HC Spartak Moscow players
Living people
Russian ice hockey defencemen